Erdre-en-Anjou (literally Erdre in Anjou) is a commune in the Maine-et-Loire department of western France. Vern-d'Anjou is the municipal seat.

History 
It was established on 28 December 2015 and consists of the former communes of Brain-sur-Longuenée, Gené, La Pouëze and Vern-d'Anjou.

Population
The population data given in the table below refer to the commune in its geography as of January 2020.

See also 
Communes of the Maine-et-Loire department

References 

Erdreenanjou
States and territories established in 2015